Victoria Pitts-Taylor (née Pitts) is Professor of Feminist, Gender, and Sexuality Studies at Wesleyan University, Connecticut, and also Professor of Science in Society and Sociology there. She was formerly a professor of sociology at Queens College and the CUNY Graduate Center, New York, and visiting fellow at the Centre for the Study of Social Difference, Columbia University, New York. Pitts-Taylor is also former co-editor of the journal Women's Studies Quarterly. She has won the Robert K. Merton Book Award from the section on Science, Knowledge and Technology of the American Sociological Association, and the Feminist Philosophy of Science Prize from the Women's Caucus of the Philosophy of Science Association.

Education 
Pitts-Taylor gained her PhD in Sociology in 1999 from Brandeis University.

Publications

References

External links 
 

Brandeis University alumni
Graduate Center, CUNY faculty
Living people
Place of birth missing (living people)
Queens College, City University of New York faculty
Sociologists of science
Wesleyan University faculty
Year of birth missing (living people)